Muckalee Creek (pronounced MUHK-uh-lee) is a creek in southwest Georgia (U.S. state).

Muckalee is a name derived from the Creek language. It is also the subject of a country song by Luke Bryan titled "Muckalee Creek Water" and is mentioned in Bryan's song, "Huntin', Fishin' and Lovin' Every Day".

References

Rivers of Dougherty County, Georgia
Rivers of Lee County, Georgia
Rivers of Sumter County, Georgia
Rivers of Georgia (U.S. state)